Samsara Inc. is an American IoT company headquartered in San Francisco, California. The company has additional offices in San Jose, California, Atlanta, London, Paris, Munich and Krakow. Samsara develops a connected operations platform for tracking fleets of vehicles and other equipment. To date, the company has raised $930 million in funding.

History 
Co-founders Sanjit Biswas and John Bicket met while graduate students at the Massachusetts Institute of Technology. The pair founded Samsara in 2015 after selling their previous startup, Meraki, to Cisco Systems in 2012. Samsara was initially created to provide wireless sensors, and Andreessen Horowitz became a Series A round early investor.

Samsara achieved unicorn status in March 2018 after a funding round led to a valuation of over $1B. Another funding round later that year rose the valuation to $3.6B backed by Andreessen Horowitz and General Catalyst. Samsara expanded internationally and opened an office in London in 2018, which expanded into its European headquarters in 2019. Samsara also expanded their footprint domestically into Midtown Atlanta with a new east coast office location. A Series F funding round saw Samsara's valuation rise to $6.3B with Tiger Global Management and Dragoneer Investment Group joining for the first time.

Samsara was impacted during the COVID-19 pandemic which resulted in a reduction to their staff.

In 2020, Samsara recognized 5 companies with its Top Fleet Awards. These included Sprint Waste Services for safest fleet, GP Transco for best fleet for drivers, ArcBest for fleet innovator, Goodfellow Bros for excellence in performance, and Athens-Clarke County for excellence in public fleet management.

In February 2021, the startup announced that it had surpassed $300 million in run-rate subscription revenue, serving over 20,000 customers and adding seven new patents.  In July, Samsara partnered with EVgo, a public EV charging network, with the hopes of expediting the electrification process for its commercial fleet customers.

It was reported in September 2021 that Samsara had filed their Form S-1 for a proposed initial public offering. The IPO was filed on November 19, 2021.

References

External links 
 

2015 establishments in California
American companies established in 2015
Technology companies established in 2015
Internet of things companies
Information technology companies of the United States
Companies based in San Francisco
2021 initial public offerings
Companies listed on the New York Stock Exchange